Tamás Benkócs (born 1972) is a Hungarian classical bassoonist.

Biography and career 
Tamás Benkócs studied music at the Franz Liszt Academy of Music in Budapest, Hungary, where he studied with Laszlo Hara, Jozsef Vajda and Tibor Fulemile. While studying, at the age of twenty, he was appointed principal bassoonist of the Budapest Festival Orchestra. He joined the newly founded Malaysian Philharmonic Orchestra in 1998 as principal bassoonist and in 2004 returned to his native Hungary where he continued working with the Budapest Festival Orchestra. 

Benkócs has performed as a soloist in Germany, Hungary and Singapore, and performs regularly with the Budapest Festival Orchestra. He has recorded a number of CDs, notably recording five discs of Vivaldi's complete bassoon concertos for the Naxos label.

References

External links
 Tamás Benkócs's biography and discography on the Naxos web site

Hungarian musicians
1972 births
Living people